Mona Vale Bus Depot is a bus depot in the Sydney suburb of Mona Vale operated by Keolis Downer Northern Beaches.

History
Mona Vale Bus Depot opened on 26 January 1970. It took over most of the routes north of Narrabeen from Brookvale Bus Depot. In October 2021 it was included in the transfer of region 8 from State Transit to Keolis Downer Northern Beaches.

As of November 2022, it has an allocation of 125 buses.

References

External links
Service NSW

Bus garages
Industrial buildings in Sydney
Transport infrastructure completed in 1970
1970 establishments in Australia